Virginia v. Cherrix is a 2006 court case in which the Commonwealth of Virginia sued to force Starchild Abraham ("Wolf") Cherrix (born June 1990), aged 16 at the time of the court case, to undergo further conventional medical treatment for a highly treatable form of cancer, Hodgkin disease.

Cherrix was diagnosed with the blood cancer and underwent an initial round of chemotherapy in 2005.  When he was told in early 2006 that he needed further treatment, he rejected any further use of chemotherapy or radiation because of the side effects.  His parents supported his choice, and were accused by the state of medical neglect of their child. The lower court decided against the parents, but the decision was overturned on appeal and the parties reached a compromise in a consent decree, in which Cherrix would receive treatment from a board-certified specialist of Cherrix's choice.

The case resulted in a new law, dubbed Abraham's Law, that increased the rights of patients aged 14 to 17 in Virginia to refuse medical treatment.

Cherrix reached the age of majority in June 2008, and has been free to pursue or reject treatment without legal oversight since then, like any other adult.  , Cherrix was alive, had decided to pursue evidence-based medicine rather than alternative medicine products, and had achieved a remission after receiving high-dose chemotherapy and stem cell transplant.

Court case 
When Cherrix and his parents refused a second round of chemotherapy, the Accomack County Department of Social Services accused his parents of medical neglect of a child in 2006.  The juvenile court found the parents guilty of medical neglect and ordered Cherrix back into conventional treatment.  An appeal to the circuit court reversed the decision and resulted in a consent decree in August 2006 that permitted Cherrix to receive treatment from a board-certified oncologist, Arnold Smith of Mississippi, who is interested in alternative cancer treatments.

Cherrix's treatment 

Cherrix was diagnosed with Hodgkin's disease in 2005 and underwent three months of chemotherapy, a standard medical treatment with significant side effects.  Hodgkin's disease is a highly treatable, even curable, type of lymphoma; 96% of young patients survive at least five years after conventional treatment. He said later that the side effects were so severe that he had wished he were dead during treatment.

In 2006, when the cancer returned, he rejected further conventional treatment and went to Mexico to receive Hoxsey Therapy (an herbal concoction based on the plants eaten by a horse with a cancerous growth in the 19th century), which has been illegal in the United States since 1960 after it was proven to be ineffective. His parents were charged with medical neglect as a result of this decision.

After the circuit court overturned the conviction of his parents in August 2006, Cherrix's treatment was supervised by Arnold Smith of Mississippi, a radiation oncologist with an interest in alternative cancer therapies.  His treatment under Smith included low-dose radiation therapy as well as a sugar-free, wheat free, organic food diet, and various vitamins, aimed at increasing his immune system's activity.  Cherrix has cycled in and out of apparent remission under this treatment plan, with the need for a fifth round of treatments at the end of 2009.

In June 2008, Cherrix celebrated his 18th birthday and the completion of the requirement to report his medical condition to the courts.

Resulting law 
As a result of Cherrix case the Virginia legislature enacted "Abraham's Law", which amended § 63.2-100 of the Code of Virginia to permit parents to refuse medical treatment or to choose alternative treatments for adolescents aged 14 to 17 with a life-threatening medical condition, if the teenager seems to be mature, both the parents and the child have considered the treatment options available to them, and all agree that their choice is in the teen's best interest.

Similar cases
In May 2009, a judge in the state of Minnesota ruled that Daniel Hauser, age 13, has been "medically neglected" as a result of his parents' refusal to allow him to receive chemotherapy for Hodgkin's lymphoma, the same disease at issue in Virginia v. Cherrix.  The likelihood of a cure with treatment is 85–90%; without treatment, patients die.  Unlike Cherrix's case, Hauser was determined to have a "rudimentary understanding at best" of his condition.

After one chemotherapy treatment, the family refused to continue.  The mother and her son fled the state, and a Minnesota district judge issued a felony arrest warrant.  Daniel was distressed by the side effects of chemotherapy, and his mother told the court that she preferred natural healing and they would both resist court orders to provide it.  They returned from California five days later, and Daniel underwent conventional treatment, which appears to have cured his cancer.

References

2006 in American law
Medical ethics